Luiz Antonio de Assis Brasil (born in 1945, Porto Alegre) is a Brazilian writer and university professor.

Books
 Um quarto de légua em quadro (1976)
 A prole do corvo (1978)
 Bacia das almas (1981)
 Manhã transfigurada (1982)
 As virtudes da casa (1985)
 O homem amoroso (1986)
 Cães da província (1987)
 Videiras de cristal (1990)
 Perversas famílias (1992)
 Pedra da memória (1993)
 Os senhores do século (1994)
 Concerto campestre (1997)
 Anais da Província-Boi (1997)
 Breviário das terras do Brasil (1997)
 O pintor de retratos (2001)
 A margem imóvel do rio (2003)
 Música perdida (2006)
 Ensaios Íntimos e Imperfeitos (2008)

References

External links
 Official Website

Brazilian male writers
People from Porto Alegre
1945 births
Living people
Pontifical Catholic University of Rio Grande do Sul alumni